Ole Fingalf Harbek (26 July 1887 – 1 March 1974) was a Norwegian jurist and politician. He was born in Larvik. He served as district stipendiary magistrate in Nedre Romerike from 1936, and in Horten from 1950. In 1940 he was a member of the Administrative Council and led the Ministry of Justice.

He was decorated Commander of the Royal Norwegian Order of St. Olav in 1963.

References

1887 births
1974 deaths
People from Larvik
Norwegian jurists
Norwegian civil servants
Norwegian politicians
Ministers of Justice of Norway